Anderson Matheus Cuello Rodríguez (born 10 December 1995) is a Uruguayan footballer who plays as a midfielder for Villa Teresa in the Uruguayan Segunda División.

References

1995 births
Living people
Canadian Soccer Club players
Montevideo City Torque players
Liverpool F.C. (Montevideo) players
Sportivo Cerrito players
Villa Teresa players
Uruguayan Primera División players
Uruguayan Segunda División players
Uruguayan footballers
Association football midfielders
People from Rivera Department